Masterblazer is a video game developed by Rainbow Arts and published by Lucasfilm Games in 1990 for the Amiga, Atari ST, and MS-DOS. It is the sequel to the 1985 game Ballblazer. 

Masterblazer presentes a futuristic sport where the playing field is a large rectangle made of squares. A Plasmorb ball must be moved into a goal as many times as possible within the course of three minutes. This is accomplished by using a Rotofoil vehicle. Unlike its predecessor, the game features a tournament mode which allows up to 8 players to compete for the Master Blazer prize. This game also allows Rotofoils to race against each other (basically a normal game but without the ball).

References

External links
 Masterblazer at Atari Mania
 Masterblazer at Lemon Amiga

1990 video games
Amiga games
Atari ST games
DOS games
LucasArts games
Video game sequels
Video games scored by Chris Huelsbeck
Video games scored by Jochen Hippel
Video games developed in Germany
Rainbow Arts games
Single-player video games